Pero Defformero are a Serbian band from Novi Sad. The band parodies turbo-folk music by combining it with heavy metal and humorous lyrics.

Band history

Formation and breakup (1993-1997) 
The first idea of combining hard rock and heavy metal with turbo-folk came up in the early 1990s when Saša Friš, a guitar player from Novi Sad wrote a song called "Veče na plaži" ("An Evening at the Beach") later rerecorded as "Ostavljen sam ja" ("I've Been Left"). Friš was joined by Dragan "Sneki" Jovanić who did the arrangements and production. Both songs were recorded in 1993. Following the arrival of vocalists Željko Jojkić, Friš wrote another song called "Srca tvoga plam" ("A Sparkle of Your Heart") later rerecorded as "Došli smo do kraja puta" ("We Came to the End of the Road"). In order to continue their work, Friš needed a full-time band so Tibor Lakatoš (bass guitar) and Srđan Milovanović (drums) were recruited. The band got the name by a character from Alan Ford comic book.

As the amount of material became bigger, the idea of recording an album became apparent and the band entered the "Pro Sound" studio in Novi Sad in the summer of 1994 to record their debut album. Pero Defformero was released in the autumn of 1995 through record label Music YUser. The album consisted of nine tracks and promotional video was recorded for the track "Srca tvoga plam". After the album was released, Jojkić and Lakatoš left the band and were replaced by Goran Biševac (vocals) and Miroslav Mijatović (bass). The band then recorded their second album Pero Defformero II (also known as Nazovi drugi album or Napalm, Nitro, Turbo, Disko) which was never officially released. In the meantime the band changed the lineup featuring Slobodan Stanojević instead of Milovanović on drums. Due to misunderstandings, the band ceased to exist in 1997.

Reformation (2003-present) 
In 2003 a fan recognized some of the band members and managed to persuade them to reunite and start playing again and after seven years the band became active again. After performing for a while and making a small pause in their work the band entered "Mr. Big" studio in 2006. The demo recorded consisted of four tracks produced by Dragan Jovanić and was presented on their official Myspace. Some of the tracks appeared on the debut album, but were rerecorded and renamed. The lineup changed for the last time when bassist Mijatović left due to personal reasons and was replaced by Nenad Kovačević. Together they participated the various artists tribute to Đorđe Balašević called Neki noviji klinci i..., with the cover version of "Jaroslava".

In January 2008, the band entered "Piknik" studio to record their long-awaited second album consisting of new material and remixed old songs from Pero Defformero and the never-released Pero Defformero II. A year later, in January 2009, Undergrand appeared through Multimedia Records and a promotional video was released for the track "Dosli smo do kraja puta". The band continued promoting the new album throughout 2010, also performing the single from the upcoming album, "Sedmica na Lotu" ("Seven Hits in a Lottery Game").

In November 2012, the band announced their upcoming album Novokomponovani Senti-Metal (Newly Composed Senti-Metal) with a video for the song "Volim te... Tu nema ljubavi" ("I Love You... There Is No Love").

Members

Timeline

Discography

Studio albums 
 Pero Defformero (1995)
 Undergrand (2009)
 Jer To Liči Na Taj Način? (2014)

Other appearances 
"Jaroslava" (Neki noviji klinci i...; 2007)

See also 
 Turbo-folk

References

 NS rockopedija, novosadska rock scena 1963-2003, Bogomir Mijatović, Publisher: SWITCH, 2005

Serbian rock music groups
Folk metal musical groups
Musical groups established in 1993
Musical groups from Novi Sad
Serbian hard rock musical groups
Serbian heavy metal musical groups
1993 establishments in Yugoslavia